Stars and Stripes is a daily American military newspaper reporting on matters concerning the members of the United States Armed Forces and their communities, with an emphasis on those serving outside the United States. It operates from inside the Department of Defense, but is editorially separate from it, and its First Amendment protection is safeguarded by the United States Congress to whom an independent ombudsman, who serves the readers' interests, regularly reports. As well as a website, Stars and Stripes publishes four daily print editions for U.S. military service members serving overseas; these European, Middle Eastern, Japanese, and South Korean editions are also available as free downloads in electronic format, and there are also seven digital editions. The newspaper has its headquarters in Washington, D.C.

History

Creation 
On November 9, 1861, during the Civil War, soldiers of the 11th, 18th, and 29th Illinois Regiments set up camp in the Missouri city of Bloomfield. Finding the local newspaper's office empty, they decided to print a newspaper about their activities. They called it the Stars and Stripes. Tradition holds this as the origin story for the newspaper, and the Stars and Stripes Museum/Library Association is located in Bloomfield.

World War I 

During World War I, the staff, roving reporters, and illustrators of the Stars and Stripes were veteran reporters or young soldiers who would later become such in the post-war years. It was published by the American Expeditionary Forces (AEF) from February 8, 1918, to June 13, 1919. Harold Ross, editor of the Stars and Stripes, returned home to found The New Yorker magazine. Cyrus Baldridge, its art director and principal illustrator, became a major illustrator of books and magazines, as well as a writer, print maker and stage designer. Sports page editor Grantland Rice had a long career in journalism and founded a motion picture studio called Grantland Rice Sportlight. Drama critic Alexander Woollcott's essays for Stars and Stripes were collected in his 1919 book, The Command Is Forward.

The Stars and Stripes was then an eight-page weekly which reached a peak of 526,000 readers, relying on the improvisational efforts of its staff to get it printed in France and distributed to U.S. troops.

World War II 

During World War II, the newspaper was printed in dozens of editions in several operating theaters. Again, both newspapermen in uniform and young soldiers, some of whom would later become important journalists, filled the staffs and showed zeal and talent in publishing and delivering the paper on time. Some of the editions were assembled and printed very close to the front in order to get the latest information to the most troops. Also, during the war, the newspaper published the 53-book series G.I. Stories.

After Bill Mauldin did his popular "Up Front" cartoons for the World War II Stars and Stripes, he returned home to a successful career as an editorial cartoonist and two-time winner of the Pulitzer Prize. Pulitzer Prize-winning American journalist and war correspondent Ernie Pyle was regularly published in the Stars and Stripes before he was killed by a Japanese machine-gunner on Iejima during the Battle of Okinawa.

The magazine frequently posted photographs of a young Marilyn Monroe, then known as Norma Jeane Dougherty, which later led her as being named "Miss Cheesecake 1952" by Stars and Stripes.

Modern era 

Funding and relevance in the digital age have threatened the paper's budget. In 2013, the paper faced job cuts, printing-schedule changes, a pay-raise freeze and travel limitations for staff under the Federal budget sequestration. The print newspapers provide the news back home to service members who are forward-deployed in areas lacking reliable internet access. Coverage of pay and benefits is of direct concern to service members and their families along with life on base and in the field. The paper helps them be better-informed citizens about global geopolitics. Budget cuts by the Pentagon were again considered in 2016.

The Wall Street Journal reported in February 2020, that a draft budget would reduce the newspaper's federal support in 2021 under a $5 billion shift to higher priorities in the defense budget. Deputy Under Secretary of Defense Elaine McCusker indicated its funding would be cut and said: “We have essentially decided that, you know, kind of coming into the modern age that newspaper is probably not the best way that we communicate any longer.” The subsidy is more than $15 million a year, which represents approximately half the publication's budget and roughly 0.002 percent of the Department of Defense budget, which was $721,500 million in 2020. It was described by the Stars and Stripes ombudsman as "a fatal cut”. In September, Defense Secretary Mark Esper justified the decision to discontinue publication of the paper as a result of his department-wide budget review. An order for the newspaper to shutter was issued, specifically by presenting a plan for it to dissolve by September 15, including "specific timeline for vacating government owned/leased space worldwide" and to end publication by September 30, 2020. Senator Dianne Feinstein (D-CA) led a bipartisan group opposed to the move, including Tammy Duckworth (D-IL), a veteran, and Susan Collins (R-ME). On September 4, US president Donald Trump appeared to reverse this position by tweeting that funding would not be cut. On September 30 the order to close was rescinded.

Operations
Stars and Stripes is authorized by Congress and the US Department of Defense to produce independent daily military news and information distributed at U.S. military installations in Europe and Mideast and East Asia. A weekly derivative product is distributed within the United States by its commercial publishing partners. Stars and Stripes newspaper averages 32 pages each day and is published in tabloid format and online at www.stripes.com/epaper. With the website, a social media presence and a couple of podcasts, it is a modern multimedia operation. Stars and Stripes employs civilian reporters, and U.S. military senior non-commissioned officers as reporters, at a number of locations around the world, and on any given day has an audience just shy of 1.0 million. Stars and Stripes also serves independent military news and information to an online audience of about 2.0 million unique visitors per month, 60 to 70 percent of whom are located in the United States.

Stars and Stripes is a non-appropriated fund (NAF) organization, only partially subsidized by the Department of Defense. A large portion of its operating costs is earned through the sale of advertising and subscriptions but it relies on government funding to back overseas reporting and distribution. Unique among the many military publications, Stars and Stripes operates as a First Amendment newspaper and is part of the newly formed Defense Media Activity. The other entities encompassed by the Defense Media Activity (the DoD News Channel and Armed Forces Radio and Television Service, for example), are command publications of the Department of Defense; only Stars and Stripes maintains complete editorial independence.

Stars and Stripes is in the process of digitizing its World War II editions. Newspaper microfilm from 1949 to 1999 is now in searchable format through a partnership with Heritage Microfilm and has been integrated into an archives website. Newspaper Archive has also more recently made the England, Ireland and Mediterranean editions from World War II available.

Former staffers

The newspaper has been published continuously in Europe since 1942 and in the Pacific since 1945.

Notable former Stars and Stripes staffers include: CBS 60 Minutes Andy Rooney and Steve Kroft; songwriter and author Shel Silverstein; comic book illustrator Tom Sutton; authors Gustav Hasford and Ralph G. Martin; painter and cartoonist Paul Fontaine; author and television news correspondent Tony Zappone; cartoonist Vernon Grant (A Monster Is Loose in Tokyo); Hollywood photographer Phil Stern; and stock market reporter and host of public television's Wall Street Week, Louis Rukeyser, and the only Black reporter in WWII, Allan Morrison. Patricia Collins Hughes was a former WASP and advocate for WASP veteran status.

In popular culture
A photograph in Stars and Stripes loosely inspired the exploits of PFC Jack Agnew in the 1965 novel and its 1967 film adaptation, The Dirty Dozen.

American comic strips have been presented in a 15-page section, Stripes' Sunday Comics.

Sergeant J.T. "Joker" Davis and Private First Class "Rafterman" are a war correspondent and combat photographer, respectively, stationed in Da Nang for Stars and Stripes in Stanley Kubrick's 1987 film Full Metal Jacket.

See also

 Ensley Llewellyn
 List of newspapers in Washington, D.C.

References

Further reading

External links 

 
Stars and Stripes digital editions

Stars and Stripes multimedia gallery
Stars and Stripes: The American Soldiers' Newspaper of World War I, 1918 to 1919
 
 

Mass media of the military of the United States
Newspapers published in Washington, D.C.
1861 establishments in Missouri
Newspapers established in 1861
Publications disestablished in 1865
1865 disestablishments in the United States
Publications established in 1917
Publications disestablished in 1918
Newspapers established in 1942